is the thirty-fourth single by Japanese recording artist Ken Hirai. The song was written by Hirai, composed by Kiyoshi Matsuo and production was handled by Hirai. It was released on May 4, 2011 as the fifth single from Hirai's eighth studio album Japanese Singer. "Itoshiki Hibi yo" serves as theme song for the second season of the TBS drama Jin. The B-side, "Run to You" is used in Nexco Central Japan commercials starring actress Aya Ueto.

The single debuted at number 9 on the Oricon Daily Singles Chart on May 3, 2011 and climbed to number 4 on May 9, 2011. It peaked at number 7 on the Oricon Weekly Singles Chart with 13,766 copies sold. The single ranked at number 24 on the Oricon Monthly Singles Chart for the month of May 2011 with 22,456 copies sold.

The song was certified platinum for digital downloads by the RIAJ.

"Itoshiki Hibi yo" was voted third most popular drama theme song of the spring season in a RecoChoku user poll.

Track listing

Charts and sales

References 

2011 singles
Japanese television drama theme songs
Ken Hirai songs
Songs written by Ken Hirai
Defstar Records singles
+